Adam Huntsman (February 11, 1786 – August 23, 1849) was an American lawyer and politician who represented Tennessee's twelfth district in the United States House of Representatives from 1835 to 1837. He was a slaveholder.

Biography
Huntsman was born in Charlotte County, Virginia, on February 11, 1786.  He came to Knox County, Tennessee, in 1809, where he settled for about three years. It was here that he studied law under John Williams, one of Knoxville's most prominent attorneys in the early nineteenth century and later a United States Senator.

Career

Huntsman carried the legal skills he learned from Williams with him westward to Overton County, Tennessee and later Madison County, Tennessee, where he became a highly regarded criminal lawyer.

Huntsman served in the Tennessee state senate from 1815 to 1821 and from 1827 to 1831. A proponent of revision to the state constitution, he was elected a delegate for Madison County, Tennessee, at the constitutional convention held in Nashville, Tennessee, in 1834. He defeated David Crockett for the Twelfth Congressional seat in 1835, a loss that led to Crockett's journey to Texas and his death at the Alamo.

Huntsman served one term as a Jacksonian Democrat to the Twenty-fourth Congress. A leader of the Democratic Party in West Tennessee in the 1830s and 1840s, he corresponded with notable politicians of his day such as Andrew Jackson, James K. Polk, James Buchanan, and John C. Calhoun.  His term lasted from March 4, 1835, to March 4, 1837.  He ran unsuccessfully for re-election to the Twenty-fifth Congress, losing to John Wesley Crockett, his predecessor's son.

Death
Huntsman died in Jackson, Madison County, Tennessee on August 23, 1849 (aged 63) and is interred at Old Salem Cemetery near Jackson.

References

External links
Adam Huntsman entry at The Political Graveyard

The Peg Leg Politician: Adam Huntsman of Tennessee (biography)

1786 births
1849 deaths
Jacksonian members of the United States House of Representatives from Tennessee
People from Charlotte County, Virginia
19th-century American politicians
People from Jackson, Tennessee
Tennessee lawyers
19th-century American lawyers
Democratic Party Tennessee state senators